William D'Arcy or Darcy may refer to:

Bill D'Arcy (William Theodore D'Arcy, born 1939), Queensland politician, accused and convicted of sexual abuse of children
William Knox D'Arcy (1849–1917), furthered British interests in developing Persian (Iranian) oil
William Alexander D'Arcy (1863–1940), cricketer from New Zealand
Sir William Darcy (died 1540) (c. 1460–1540), Anglo-Irish statesman